Ismo Kamesaki (born 3 February 1970) is a Finnish wrestler. He competed in the men's Greco-Roman 52 kg at the 1992 Summer Olympics.

References

External links
 

1970 births
Living people
Finnish male sport wrestlers
Olympic wrestlers of Finland
Wrestlers at the 1992 Summer Olympics
People from Kuusankoski
Sportspeople from Kymenlaakso